Kieran Scott (born March 11, 1974; also known by her pen name Kate Brian) is an American author of such chick lit books as The Princess and the Pauper, Megan Meade's Guide to the McGowan Boys, The Virginity Club, Sweet 16,
Fake Boyfriend, and the Private series. Books published under Scott's own name include She's So Dead to Us, I Was a Non-Blonde Cheerleader, which was nominated for YALSA's Teens Top Ten, Brunettes Strike Back, A Non-Blonde Cheerleader in Love,  and Geek Magnet.

Biography
Scott is from Montvale, New Jersey and was raised in Bergen County. She enjoyed cheerleading, singing, and acting when she was growing up. She graduated from Pascack Hills High School and attended college at Rutgers University with a double major in English and Journalism. She worked as an editor for four years before becoming a writer.

She resides in New Jersey with her husband and sons.

Bibliography

The Cheerleader Trilogy
 I Was a Non Blonde Cheerleader (2005)
 Brunettes Strike Back (2006)
 A Non-Blonde Cheerleader in Love (2007)

The So Trilogy
 She's So Dead To Us (May 25, 2010)
 He's So Not Worth It (June 7, 2011)
 This Is So Not Happening (May 1, 2012)

Young Adult Fiction

 Kiss and Tell (1998)
 Trust Me (1999)
 While You Were Gone (1999)
 How Do I Tell? (1999)
 The Dance (2001)
 Mary-Kate and Ashley: Sweet 16: The Perfect Summer (book 3) (2002)
 Jingle Boy (2003)
 The Princess and the Pauper (2003)
 The Virginity Club (2004)
 Megan Meade's Guide to the McGowan Boys (2005)
 Sweet 16 (2005)
 Lucky T (2005)
 Fake Boyfriend (2006)
 Geek Magnet (2008)
 Ex-Mas (2009)

Shadowlands series
 Shadowlands (2013)
 Hereafter (October 2013)
 Endless (July 2014)

Nonfiction

 Leonardo DiCaprio (1998)
 Ultimate Cheerleading (1998)
 Matt Damon (1998)
 I Was a Mouseketeer! (2001)
 Cameron Diaz (2001)
 Salma Hayek (2001)
 The Diary of Disney Vero Beach (2010)

Private series

Private (July 1, 2006)
Invitation Only (November 7, 2006)
Untouchable (December 26, 2006)
Confessions (April 24, 2007)
Inner Circle (August 28, 2007)
Legacy (February 19, 2008)
Ambition (May 5, 2008)
Revelation (September 16, 2008)
Last Christmas: The Private Prequel  (October 7, 2008)
Paradise Lost (February 24, 2009)
Suspicion (September 8, 2009)
Scandal (March 9, 2010)
Vanished (August 31, 2010)
The Book of Spells: A Private Prequel (December 21, 2010)
Ominous (February 22, 2011)
Vengeance (August 30, 2011)

Privilege series

Privilege (December 30, 2008)
Beautiful Disaster (June 2, 2009)
Perfect Mistake (October 27, 2009)
Sweet Deceit (June 8, 2010)
Pure Sin (October 5, 2010)
Cruel Love (June 7, 2011)

References

External links
Kate Brian's Myspace Page
Kieran Scott's Myspace Page
Kieran Scott's Official Webpage
Private Novels

1974 births
Living people
20th-century American novelists
21st-century American novelists
American chick lit writers
American non-fiction writers
American women novelists
Novelists from New Jersey
Pascack Hills High School alumni
People from Montvale, New Jersey
People from Ridgewood, New Jersey
Rutgers University alumni
20th-century American women writers
21st-century American women writers